Freestream is a term in aerodynamics.

Freestream may also refer to:

 Freestream (cars), a company bought by Caparo, now trading as Caparo Vehicle Technologies
 Free streaming, the non-scattering motion of a particle in astronomy